Lancelot II Schetz , 2nd Count of Grobbendonk, baron of Wezemaal, lord of Durbuy, Tilburg, etc., was a Netherlandish nobleman and a military commander during the later stages of the Eighty Years' War.

Schetz was the eldest son and heir of the celebrated commander Anthonie Schetz. In 1638 he held the rank of colonel and was military governor of Saint-Omer when the town was besieged by the French.

Lancelot inherited his father's titles as count of Grobbendonk and baron of Wezemaal in 1641, and his mother's title to the lordship of Tilburg in 1650. He was lord of Durbuy through his marriage to Marguerite-Claire de Noyelles.

He would later become governor of the Duchy of Limburg. He died in 1664.

Children 
 Charles Hubert Auguste Schetz, died 1672: died in the Franco-Dutch War during the Battle of Kruipin, Woerden.
 Anthony III Ignace Schetz, died 1726: married to Marie Madeleine de Berghes, daughter of Eugene de Berghes, 2nd Count of Grimberghen.

References

1664 deaths
Ursel
Dutch military commanders
Mayors of the City of Brussels
Dutch people of the Eighty Years' War (Spanish Empire)
Year of birth unknown